Marina Kalashnikova (died 3 August 2013) was a Russian historian and freelance journalist. In 2010 she and her ex-KGB agent husband Viktor Kalashnikov were treated in hospital in Germany for mercury poisoning in what they have said was an attempt on their life by Russia's FSB, the successor to the KGB. The case has been compared to the alleged poisoning and murder of Russian dissident Alexander Litvinenko. She died of cancer in Moscow in 2013.

Personal life
She was married to Viktor Kalashnikov, a former KGB colonel and journalist.

Activities
Kalashnikova and her husband had been publishing articles critical of the Russian Government since the 1990s. They left Russia and have lived in various countries, such as the Ukraine, Poland, Estonia and now Germany. They claim to have been warned to cease their activities at various points in the 1990s and 2000s by KGB agents.

Views
Kalashnikova considers Russia to be ruled in an anti-democratic way:  "It is clear that the [Kremlin] regime has no restraint and will commit any crime, break any rule, surpass any benchmark in order to consolidate its already illegitimate power". She has also criticised Western analysts for thinking that conflict with Russia can be avoided. In August 2009 she stated, "The West does not care to wake from the dream of its wishful thinking, even when Moscow turns to [...] reanimating Joseph Stalin’s cult of personality together with the ideology of the Cheka."

She also accuses Russia of trying to expand its influence around the world: "The Kremlin has activated a network of extremists in the Third World [...] Russia has managed to shake off nearly all international conventions restricting the expansion of its military power."

In the view of writer Jeffrey R. Nyquist, these kinds of views have made Kalashnikova a target: "When Marina Kalashnikova presented her analysis to Russian and Ukrainian readers on August 26, 2008, she annoyed the regime and made herself a target of the Russian secret police. Her Moscow residence was broken into. Private papers were stolen. Threats were made. And last, but not least, she was forcibly incarcerated in a  psychiatric clinic for 35 days. 'I am completely healthy,' Kalashnikova told me during a telephone interview on Sunday. 'It was absolutely political … and not medical at all.'" Kalashnikova said that the authorities justified her detention as being because she had been "aggressive".

Poisoning
In 2010, Kalashnikova noticed she was losing her hair. Doctors at Berlin's Charite hospital discovered that she had 56 microgrammes of mercury per litre of blood, while her husband had 53.7 microgrammes. The safe level is between one and three microgrammes. Viktor Kalashnikov has told the press that "Moscow poisoned us".

The case has been compared with that of another former Russian security officer, Alexander Litvinenko, who was murdered in London in 2006. He was administered radioactive polonium.

Later, German prosecutors have dropped an investigation. Spokesman for the state prosecutor's office in Berlin told the AFP news agency: "There is no evidence that they were poisoned, at least in Germany."

See also
Karinna Moskalenko – lawyer who claims to have been poisoned with mercury by the Russian authorities

References

2013 deaths
Political abuses of psychiatry 
Russian journalists
Year of birth missing